Nova Terra is a 1932 Dutch documentary film directed by Gerard Rutten.

Cast
Janne Donk	... 	Old boatsmans wife
Adolphe Engers	... 	Old boatsman
Piet Rienks	... 	Servant

See also
Dutch films of the 1930s

External links 
 

1932 documentary films
1932 films
Dutch black-and-white films
Black-and-white documentary films
Dutch documentary films
1930s Dutch-language films